Guy Hubert Bailey (born August 9, 1950) is a sociolinguist and the 1st president of the University of Texas–Rio Grande Valley. He was the president of the University of Alabama, his baccalaureate alma mater. He was previously the president of Texas Tech University and held earlier positions at Emory University, Texas A&M University, and Oklahoma State University, prior to serving as dean of liberal arts at University of Nevada, Las Vegas. From there he became provost of the University of Texas at San Antonio. Before assuming the role at Texas Tech, he was the chancellor of the University of Missouri–Kansas City.

Education
Bailey holds a bachelor's and master's degrees in English from the University of Alabama and a doctorate in English linguistics from the University of Tennessee. He did postdoctoral studies at Emory University and Stanford University. He is the author of over 100 books and articles.

Career

University of Texas at San Antonio
Before accepting the position of chancellor at the University of Missouri–Kansas City, Bailey served as the provost at the University of Texas at San Antonio.

University of Missouri–Kansas City
Bailey's term as chancellor of the University of Missouri–Kansas City began on January 1, 2006.

Texas Tech University

On July 2, 2008, Bailey was selected to succeed Jon Whitmore as the president of Texas Tech University. He assumed the position on August 1, 2008. Bailey's wife, Jan Tillery, is a Texas Tech graduate who was raised in the Lubbock area.

University of Alabama

On July 11, 2012, Bailey was named the incoming president of the University of Alabama. His appointment began in early September 2012. On October 31, 2012, Bailey announced he was stepping down as president of the University, to focus on his wife's healthcare needs.

University of Texas–Rio Grande Valley

In 2014, Bailey was revealed to be a shortlisted candidate for the position of inaugural president of The University of Texas–Rio Grande Valley. He was announced as the sole finalist, and de facto incoming president, on 28 April 2014.

Work in linguistics
Bailey is known nationally for his work in linguistics and has often researched jointly with his wife. One of his most notable projects is a long-term sociolinguistic study, in collaboration with Patricia Cukor-Avila, in the Brazos Valley of Texas.

Family
Bailey has two adult children, Jordan and Brooks, from his first marriage. He was married to his second wife Jan Tillery-Bailey until her death on September 1, 2013.

References

1950 births
Living people
Linguists from the United States
Emory University faculty
Oklahoma State University faculty
Presidents of the University of Alabama
Presidents of Texas Tech University
Presidents of the University of Texas Rio Grande Valley
Sociolinguists
Texas A&M University faculty
University of Alabama alumni
University of Missouri–Kansas City faculty
University of Nevada, Las Vegas faculty
University of Tennessee alumni
University of Texas at San Antonio people